The Campus may refer to:
The Campus (CCNY), the oldest student-run newspaper within the CUNY system
The Campus (TV series), a Ugandan television series

See also
Campus (disambiguation)